Lysle K. Butler (1903 – July 1973) was an American football, basketball, and tennis coach and college athletics administrator. Butler served as the head football coach at Franklin College in Franklin, Indiana from 1928 to 1929. He spent the next 28 seasons coach at Oberlin College in Oberlin, Ohio, where he also served as the head basketball coach in four separate stints.

Head coaching record

College football

References

External links
 

1903 births
1973 deaths
Basketball coaches from Ohio
Franklin Grizzlies football coaches
Oberlin Yeomen and Yeowomen athletic directors
Oberlin Yeomen basketball coaches
Oberlin Yeomen basketball players
Oberlin Yeomen football coaches
Oberlin Yeomen football players
College men's tennis players in the United States
College tennis coaches in the United States
High school football coaches in Ohio
People from Amherst, Ohio
Players of American football from Ohio
Basketball players from Ohio
Tennis people from Ohio